The 2012 Premiership Rugby Sevens Series (styled for sponsorship reasons as the 2012 J.P Morgan Asset Management Premiership Rugby 7s Series) was the third Rugby Union 7-a-side competition for the twelve 2012–13 Aviva Premiership Clubs. It began on Friday July 13 and lasted 4 weeks, with the final at the Recreation Ground on Friday 3 August 2012.

Format
The twelve Premiership Clubs were split into three Groups – A, B and C – with each group playing in a consecutive week in July. Each team in the group played each other once, to the International Rugby Board Laws of the Game - 7s Variations. Based on the result, teams received:
4 points for a win
2 points for a draw
1 bonus point for a loss by seven points or less
1 bonus point for scoring four or more tries in a match
Following all the games, the winner and runner up in the group progressed to the final.  In the final, the 6 teams (3 Winners and 3 Runners up) were split into 2 pools. Again teams played each other once and points were awarded based on the result. Following the culmination of this stage the winners of each pool progressed to the final, the winner of that game being declared the champions.

Group stage
The group draw was based on geographical positioning of the clubs playing, with the exception of London Welsh, who were swapped for Newcastle Falcons following their successful promotion appeal. Premiership Rugby confirmed the match times at 2pm on 4 July 2012.

Group A
Played at The Stoop, Twickenham on Friday 13 July 2012.

Group B
Was played at Edgeley Park, Stockport on Friday 20 July 2012.

Group C
Was played at Kingsholm, Gloucester on Thursday 26 July 2012.

Final stage
The finals were played at The Recreation Ground, Bath on Friday 3 August 2012.

For the finals, the 6 qualified teams were split into two pools of three teams.  Scoring remained the same as in the previous rounds (4 points for a win, etc.), and the winner of each pool progressed to the final.

Pool A

Pool B

 London Irish 7s qualified for the final with the greatest points difference.

Final
The final was contested by the winners of the two finals pools.

In a slight difference to the rest of the series, the final was played in two halves of 10 minutes (instead of 7 minutes), with a slightly longer half-time.

 London Irish 7s won the 2012 Premiership Rugby Sevens Series.

References

Premiership Rugby Sevens Series
Sevens
English Premiership